Gnomibidion is a genus of beetles in the family Cerambycidae, containing the following species:

 Gnomibidion araujoi (Martins, 1962)
 Gnomibidion armaticolle (Martins, 1965)
 Gnomibidion biacutum Martins, 1968
 Gnomibidion cylindricum (Thomson, 1865)
 Gnomibidion denticolle (Dalman, 1823)
 Gnomibidion digrammum (Bates, 1870)
 Gnomibidion flavum Martins & Galileo, 2007
 Gnomibidion fulvipes (Thomson, 1865)
 Gnomibidion occultum Martins, 1968
 Gnomibidion translucidum (Martins, 1960)
 Gnomibidion variabile Martins & Galileo, 2003

References

Ibidionini